Following is a list of all Article III United States federal judges appointed by President Ronald Reagan during his presidency. In total Reagan appointed: four justices to the Supreme Court of the United States, including the appointment of a sitting associate justice as chief justice, 83 judges to the United States courts of appeals, 290 judges to the United States district courts and 6 judges to the United States Court of International Trade. Reagan's total of 383 Article III judicial appointments is the most by any president.

In addition to these appointments, Reagan signed the Federal Courts Improvement Act in 1982, which transferred five judges from the United States Court of Customs and Patent Appeals, and seven judges from the appellate division of the United States Court of Claims, into the newly created United States Court of Appeals for the Federal Circuit. Although each of those twelve judges had been appointed to their original tribunals by previous presidents, Reagan's signing of the act effectively placed all of them on the new Court of Appeals.

Eleven of Reagan's appointees remain in active service, 5 appellate judges and 6 district judges.
Four additional judges named by Reagan to district courts remain in active service as appellate judges by appointment of later presidents.

United States Supreme Court justices

Courts of appeals

District courts

United States Court of International Trade

Specialty courts (Article I)

United States Court of Federal Claims

Notes

Renominations

References
General

 

Specific

Sources
 Federal Judicial Center

Reagan

Ronald Reagan-related lists